idio Ltd. is an enterprise software company that produces and implements products for brands and publishers. To do so, idio uses its cloud-hosted platform, which incorporates modules for large-scale content aggregation and structuring, content analytics (most fundamentally, semantic extraction), multi-channel marketing automation, and customer insight generation. idio has offices in London and Exeter in the UK.

In early 2011, idio acquired thrudigital to expand its engineering team and set up a London office.

History 

idio was founded in 2006, by Edward Barrow and Andrew Davies, at Warwick Business School in the UK, with the aim of building a system to personalize content effectively. After several months, idiomag was launched. This consumer-facing personalized music magazine was a proving ground for the technical and commercial approach of idio. Based on this, idio refocused on a business-to-business proposition, and started licensing the technology to brands and publishers;  to aggregate social media content, deliver personalized multi-channel content services, and to monitor user interactions. idio has since refined this proposition and delivers a range of content and customer intelligence solutions.

Offerings

Platform 

idio has a growing range of modules built on its platform, including the following:
 Content Aggregation (from multiple sources and formats) 
 Content Analytics (including semantic extraction, sentiment analysis, language detection and readability)
 Meta-analysis (building an organic taxonomy of the content, and providing analytics on trends)
 Multi-channel Delivery (including web, mobile, email, social media, performance advertising, and SMS)
 Customer Insight (preference and behavioural web analytics, and CRM data augmentation)

These modules deliver a range of solutions, including the following:
 Editorial Dashboard (providing a customized market-view of real-time analysed content to editors)
 Content Marketing (aggregating multiple content archives to deliver the right content to the right customer at the right time, on the right channel)
 Content Insight (analyzing large unstructured content archives to provide structure and rich annotations)
 Customer Insight (analyzing on-site and social media interactions and preferences to augment CRM)

Chrome extensions 

In early 2010, idio launched a range of Google Chrome Extensions on Google's new Chrome Extension Marketplace. This enables users to install Chrome Extensions from many publishers, and get customized alerts when relevant news is posted. The Independent launched one in January 2010, and it now used by 20,815 people.

References

External links 
 idio Ltd.

Companies established in 2006
Privately held companies of the United Kingdom
Software companies of the United Kingdom
Google Chrome extensions
2006 establishments in England
2006 in London